Bob Isherwood is an Australian businessman, global advertising creative leader, and the co-founder of ONE School.

Education
Isherwood attended  RMIT to study Advertising Art, thanks to the intervention of Victor Greenhalgh – the head of department.  Isherwood established the Victor Greenhalgh scholarship programme for underprivileged students at RMIT.

Career

Isherwood was appointed Worldwide Creative Director of Saatchi & Saatchi in 1996, a position he held until he resigned in 2008. During that period the Network  won almost 8,000 significant creative awards. Isherwood also established and presented the Saatchi & Saatchi New Directors’ Showcase at the annual Cannes International Advertising Festival.  In 2009 Isherwood was the Creative Chairman for the UN/IAA Climate Change Initiative. www.Hopenhagen.org 

Isherwood is currently a founding partner of Dialog Health, and director of Creative Development for The One Club for Creativity. In 2019, he co-founded The ONE School, a free online portfolio program for black creatives with schools based in New York, Los Angeles, Chicago, Atlanta and the UK.

Isherwood won Australia’s first Gold Lion award for Cinema at the Cannes International Advertising Festival. He has also won a British Design and Art Direction gold award (Black Pencil) for Advertising. He was named Australia’s Leading Creative Director and received the Clio Lifetime Achievement Award.  and has been inducted into the Clio Hall of Fame. He is also a member of RMIT’s Acclaimed Alumni. And received the first ever Honorary Doctorate in Communications from RMIT in 2007. He was inducted into the Australian Writers and Art Directors Hall of Fame in August 2009.

Appointments
President, Film & Press & Poster Juries at Cannes International Festival of Creativity
Chairman of Executive TV & Radio Jury, Clio awards 
Participant in ‘2020’ initiative of Australian Prime Minister, Kevin Rudd.
Selection Panel Member, Advance Global Australian Awards 2012-2014.
Dean of the Cannes Young Creative Academy,
Adjunct Professor of Managerial Studies at Vanderbilt University.

Bibliography
‘World Changing Ideas’ – (co-authored with Richard Myers.)

Palazzo Editions

‘Art Direction (D&AD Mastercraft Series)’ – (essay by Isherwood)

Rotovision

‘Advertising Now. Print.’ (succinct essay by Isherwood)

(editor Julius Wiedemann.)
Taschen – GmbH

‘Advertising Now.’ TV Commercials: (essay by Isherwood)

Taschen – GmbH
Not Yet Available
‘Social Work: Saatchi & Saatchi’s Cause Related Ideas.’

Te Neues Publishing Co.

‘The 22 Irrefutable Laws of Advertising (and When to Violate Them)’ 
(by Michael Newman, foreword by Isherwood.)
Published by Wiley

References

Living people
Australian advertising executives
RMIT University alumni
Businesspeople from Melbourne
Year of birth missing (living people)